An airport is a location where aircraft take off and land.
Airport may also refer to:

Transportation

Airports
Airport & South Line a commuter rail service operated by Sydney Trains, Australia
Airport, Pinellas County, FL, St. Pete–Clearwater International Airport, Florida, United States
Airports, Los Angeles Department of, the airport operations department for the city of Los Angeles, California, United States
List of airports for all major airports

Rail stations
Airport (MARTA station), a rail station in Atlanta, Georgia, United States
Airport (MBTA station), a rail station in East Boston, Massachusetts, United States
Airport (Delhi Metro), on the Delhi Airport Express Line of the Delhi Metro
Airport (OC Transpo), a bus stop in Ottawa, Canada
Airport (UTA station), a Transit Authority station in Utah, United States

Places
Airport, California, a census-designated place in Stanislaus County, California, United States
Airport, Roanoke, Virginia, a neighborhood in Roanoke, Virginia, United States

Arts, entertainment, and media

Films
Airport (1953 film), 1953 Spanish comedy directed by Luis Lucia
Airport (film series), 1970s series of four airplane-themed disaster films
Airport (1970 film), a film based on Arthur Hailey's book
Airport 1975, sequel to the 1970 film
Airport '77, sequel to Airport 1975
The Concorde ... Airport '79, 1979 sequel to Airport '77
Airport (1993 film), a 1993 Tamil action film
Airport (2009 film), a 2009 Hindi film

Television
Airport (TV series), a 1996 British reality television series
The Airport, 1992 episode of Seinfeld

Other arts, entertainment, and media
Airport (novel), a 1968 novel written by Arthur Hailey
"Airport" (song), 1978 single by English band The Motors

Other uses
AirPort, a product range and implementation of the IEEE 802.11 ("Wi-Fi") protocol by Apple Inc.

See also
Aeroport (disambiguation)